Pengkalan Kempas (Jawi: ڤڠكالن كمڤاس) is a small town in Port Dickson District, Negeri Sembilan, Malaysia. The Pengkalan Kempas Historical Complex or Fort Kempas is located here. It is also called "Keramat Ujung Pasir".

Pengkalan Kempas Historical Complex (Fort Kempas)
Located about 23 km from the Cape Rachado (Tanjung Tuan) lighthouse and 34 km from Port Dickson town. Here you will find a 15th-century tomb of a leading historical personality, Ulama Sheikh Ahmad Makhtum, with its famous carved megalith. Next to his grave are the famous stone inscriptions or "Batu Bersurat" which depict his struggle and victory. The enigma surrounding the stone remains unsolved to this day. Of special interest is the ‘ordeal stone’, an ancient lie-detector, through which a person puts his arm when answering questions. If he lies, the stone tightens like a vice.

Port Dickson District
Towns in Negeri Sembilan